Bee Ridge may refer to:
 Bee Ridge, Florida, a census-designated place
 Bee Ridge, Indiana, an unincorporated community
 Bee Ridge (Missouri), a landform
 Bee Ridge Township, Knox County, Missouri